The Veterans Memorial Centennial Bridge (formerly known as the Bennett Bay Centennial Bridge) is a freeway bridge in Idaho. The bridge carries Interstate 90 over a valley above Bennett Bay, an arm of Lake Coeur d'Alene.

Construction of the bridge began in 1988 and used a balanced cantilever to build sections at an average rate of  a week. It was completed in 1991 and opened the following year as part of the last major project to complete Interstate 90 east of Coeur d'Alene, at a cost of $16 million.

The bridge was initially named the Bennett Bay Centennial Bridge, to commemorate the centennial of Idaho, despite a long-standing state policy against adopting official bridge names. In 1992, the bridge was renamed the Veterans Memorial Centennial Bridge, in honor of Idaho's military veterans.

It was designed by HNTB.

References

Monuments and memorials in Idaho
Bridges completed in 1991
Buildings and structures in Kootenai County, Idaho
Transportation in Kootenai County, Idaho
Road bridges in Idaho
Interstate 90
Bridges on the Interstate Highway System
1991 establishments in Idaho
Concrete bridges in the United States
Box girder bridges in the United States